Kaur (Ka’ur) is a Malayic language spoken on the southeastern coast of the island of Sumatra in Indonesia. It is difficult for speakers of neighboring Central Malay (Bengkulu) to understand. Many speakers are animists.

References

Languages of Indonesia
Agglutinative languages
Malay dialects

Malayic languages